Miroslav Gojanović (born April 20, 1949) is a former Yugoslav ice hockey player. He played for the Yugoslavia men's national ice hockey team at the 1968 Winter Olympics in Grenoble and the 1976 Winter Olympics in Innsbruck.

References

1949 births
Living people
Croatian ice hockey forwards
Ice hockey players at the 1968 Winter Olympics
Ice hockey players at the 1976 Winter Olympics
Olympic ice hockey players of Yugoslavia
Sportspeople from Zagreb
Yugoslav ice hockey forwards
KHL Medveščak Zagreb players